Michele Nappi (born August 30, 1951 in San Gennaro Vesuviano) is a retired Italian professional football player who played as a defender. A hard-working and versatile player, he frequently stood out for his professionalism throughout his career.

Career
After beginning his professional career with Juve Stabia and Palmese, Nappi played for 8 seasons (172 games, 1 goal) in the Serie A for Perugia Calcio (1974–1982; 1984–85) and A.S. Roma (1982–84). Most of his career was spent with Perugia, where he won the 1974–75 Serie B title, and was a part of the 1978–79 Serie A season in which Perugia finished the season unbeaten, but still finished second in the league, behind A.C. Milan. After leaving Perugia in 1982, he spent two seasons with Roma, before returning to Perugia for a final season. With Roma, he won the Serie A championship, the Coppa Italia, and reached 1984 European Cup Final, in which Roma were defeated by Liverpool F.C. in the resulting penalty shootout.

Honours
Perugia
 Serie B: 1974–75.

Roma
 Serie A: 1982–83.
 Coppa Italia: 1983–84.

References

1951 births
Living people
Italian footballers
Serie A players
Serie B players
S.S. Juve Stabia players
A.C. Perugia Calcio players
A.S. Roma players

Association football defenders
People from San Gennaro Vesuviano